is a train station on the Hankyu Railway Kyoto Line located in Takatsuki, Osaka Prefecture, Japan.

It is one of the main train stations of the city along with  Station on the JR Kyoto Line.

Lines
Hankyu Kyoto Main Line

All types of train services on the line stop at Takatsuki-shi as one of key stations along the line. Many trains from Osaka, especially Osaka Metro rolling stock-operated services from the Sakaisuji Line, terminate at Takatsuki-shi.

History
The station opened on January 16, 1928, and served as the terminal of the Shin-Keihan Line until its extension to Kyoto in November 1928. The station name was originally Takatsuki-machi (meaning Takatsuki Town) and was changed to the present one in 1943 when the town obtained the city status.

The construction of the elevated station replacing the original ground-level station was completed in 1994.

Station numbering was introduced to all Hankyu stations on 21 December 2013 with this station being designated as station number HK-72.

Layout
The elevated station consists of three levels:
 1st level (ground): Ming Hankyu Takatsuki shopping center
 2nd level: Station facilities (concourses, ticket gates and offices) and Ming Hankyu Takatsuki shopping center
 3rd level: Platforms and tracks
There are two island platforms, each of which serves two tracks.

Adjacent stations

References

External links
  Takatsuki-shi Station from Hankyu Railway website
  Ming Hankyu Takatsuki

Railway stations in Japan opened in 1928
Hankyu Kyoto Main Line
Railway stations in Osaka Prefecture